The 1984 Belgian Grand Prix was a Formula One motor race held at Circuit Zolder on 29 April 1984. It was the third race of the 1984 Formula One World Championship. It was the 42nd Belgian Grand Prix, and the tenth and last to be held at Zolder.

The race was won from pole position by Italian driver Michele Alboreto, driving a Ferrari. It was the third Grand Prix victory for Alboreto, who also became the first Italian driver to win for Ferrari since Ludovico Scarfiotti at the 1966 Italian Grand Prix. British driver Derek Warwick finished second in a Renault, some 42 seconds behind, with Alboreto's French teammate René Arnoux third.

Warwick moved into second place in the Drivers' Championship, five points behind Frenchman Alain Prost, who failed to finish in his McLaren-TAG.

Report

Qualifying 
Goodyear dominated qualifying filling six of the top seven places with Michele Alboreto securing his first career pole position. Ferrari Teammate René Arnoux was second, followed by Keke Rosberg in the Williams FW09-Honda. Derek Warwick, the first Michelin runner, was fourth ahead of Elio de Angelis in the Lotus 95T-Renault and the surprisingly fast ATS D7-BMW in Formula One of Manfred Winkelhock. The McLarens were off the pace with points leader Alain Prost in eighth and Niki Lauda in 14th. Reigning world champion Nelson Piquet qualified his Brabham BT53-BMW ninth. The best of the Pirelli runners was Johnny Cecotto in 16th in his Toleman TG183B-Hart. The only non-qualifier was Philippe Alliot in his RAM-Hart.

Race 
Alboreto led all 70 laps and was even able to retain the lead during pit stops, despite Piquet pushing through without stopping. Warwick started well to run second for much of the race with Arnoux, Winkelhock and de Angelis pursuing. Prost and Riccardo Patrese were early retirements with Johnny Cecotto dropping out on lap 1 with a broken clutch.

Lauda's McLaren MP4/2 broke its water pump at half-distance, the second such failure for the TAG-Porsche engine after Prost suffered the same fate on the warm up lap in South Africa. Shortly afterwards Winkelhock stopped and Andrea de Cesaris crashed his Ligier JS23-Renault. Piquet found himself third after the stops, but faded as the race neared its conclusion. Arnoux moved into third until he was caught by Rosberg. Piquet's BMW engine blew and with a lap to go and Rosberg ran out of fuel, allowing Arnoux to join Alboreto and Warwick on the podium. Rosberg was classified fourth, with de Angelis fifth and Stefan Bellof completing the top six in his Tyrrell 012-Ford.

Aftermath 
The results would change months later as the impact of Tyrrell Racing's disqualification from the 1984 season saw Stefan Bellof removed from sixth position, promoting Ayrton Senna's Toleman TG183B into the points.

The Belgian Grand Prix would return to traditional home at Circuit de Spa-Francorchamps in 1985. The shortened version of the home of Belgian motorsport had its Formula One debut the previous year and proven instantly popular as Gilles Villeneuve's death two years earlier at Zolder was still fresh.

Classification

Qualifying

Race

Championship standings after the race

Drivers' Championship standings

Constructors' Championship standings

References

Belgian Grand Prix
Grand Prix
Belgian Grand Prix
Circuit Zolder